Thomas Kennerly Wolfe Jr. (March 2, 1930 – May 14, 2018) was an American author and journalist widely known for his association with New Journalism, a style of news writing and journalism developed in the 1960s and 1970s that incorporated literary techniques.

Wolfe began his career as a regional newspaper reporter in the 1950s, achieving national prominence in the 1960s following the publication of such best-selling books as The Electric Kool-Aid Acid Test (a highly experimental account of Ken Kesey and the Merry Pranksters) and two collections of articles and essays, Radical Chic & Mau-Mauing the Flak Catchers and The Kandy-Kolored Tangerine-Flake Streamline Baby. In 1979, he published the influential book The Right Stuff about the Mercury Seven astronauts, which was made into a 1983 film of the same name directed by Philip Kaufman.

His first novel, The Bonfire of the Vanities, published in 1987, was met with critical acclaim and also became a commercial success. Its adaptation as a motion picture of the same name, directed by Brian De Palma, was a critical and commercial failure.

Early life and education
Wolfe was born on March 2, 1930, in Richmond, Virginia, the son of Helen Perkins Hughes Wolfe, a garden designer, and Thomas Kennerly Wolfe Sr. (1893 - 1972), an agronomist and editor of The Southern Planter.

He grew up on Gloucester Road in the Richmond North Side neighborhood of Sherwood Park. He recounted childhood memories in a foreword to a book about the nearby historic Ginter Park neighborhood. He was student council president, editor of the school newspaper, and a star baseball player at St. Christopher's School, an Episcopal all-boys school in Richmond.  Another brief but touching memoir was written in a letter in 1991 to a man who purchased the Wolfe home place.

Upon graduation in 1947, he turned down admission to Princeton University to attend Washington and Lee University. At Washington and Lee, Wolfe was a member of the Phi Kappa Sigma fraternity. He majored in English, was sports editor of the college newspaper, and helped found a literary magazine, Shenandoah, giving him opportunities to practice his writing both inside and outside the classroom. Of particular influence was his professor Marshall Fishwick, a teacher of American studies educated at UVA and Yale. More in the tradition of anthropology than literary scholarship, Fishwick taught his students to look at the whole of a culture, including those elements considered profane. Wolfe's undergraduate thesis, entitled "A Zoo Full of Zebras: Anti-Intellectualism in America," evinced his fondness for words and aspirations toward cultural criticism. Wolfe graduated cum laude in 1951.

While still in college, Wolfe continued playing baseball as a pitcher and began to play semi-professionally. In 1952, he earned a tryout with the New York Giants, but was cut after three days, which he blamed on his inability to throw good fastballs. Wolfe abandoned baseball and instead followed his professor Fishwick's example, enrolling in Yale University's American studies doctoral program. His Ph.D. thesis was titled The League of American Writers: Communist Organizational Activity Among American Writers, 1929-1942. In the course of his research, Wolfe interviewed many writers, including Malcolm Cowley, Archibald MacLeish, and James T. Farrell. A biographer remarked on the thesis: "Reading it, one sees what has been the most baleful influence of graduate education on many who have suffered through it: It deadens all sense of style." Originally rejected, his thesis was finally accepted after he rewrote it in an objective rather than a subjective style. Upon leaving Yale, he wrote a friend, explaining through expletives his personal opinions about his thesis.

Journalism and New Journalism
Though Wolfe was offered teaching jobs in academia, he opted to work as a reporter. In 1956, while still preparing his thesis, Wolfe became a reporter for the Springfield Union in Springfield, Massachusetts. Wolfe finished his thesis in 1957.

In 1959, he was hired by The Washington Post. Wolfe has said that part of the reason he was hired by the Post was his lack of interest in politics. The Post's city editor was "amazed that Wolfe preferred cityside to Capitol Hill, the beat every reporter wanted." He won an award from The Newspaper Guild for foreign reporting in Cuba in 1961 and also won the Guild's award for humor. While there, Wolfe experimented with fiction-writing techniques in feature stories.

In 1962, Wolfe left Washington D.C. for New York City, taking a position with the New York Herald Tribune as a general assignment reporter and feature writer. The editors of the Herald Tribune, including Clay Felker of the Sunday section supplement New York magazine, encouraged their writers to break the conventions of newspaper writing. Wolfe attracted attention in 1963 when, three months before the JFK assassination, he published an article on George Ohsawa and the sanpaku condition foretelling death.

During the 1962–63 New York City newspaper strike, Wolfe approached Esquire magazine about an article on the hot rod and custom car culture of southern California. He struggled with the article until his editor, Byron Dobell, suggested that Wolfe send him his notes so they could piece the story together. Wolfe procrastinated. The evening before the deadline, he typed a letter to Dobell explaining what he wanted to say on the subject, ignoring all journalistic conventions. Dobell's response was to remove the salutation "Dear Byron" from the top of the letter and publish it intact as reportage. The result, published in 1963, was "There Goes (Varoom! Varoom!) That Kandy-Kolored Tangerine-Flake Streamline Baby." The article was widely discussed—loved by some, hated by others. Its notoriety helped Wolfe gain publication of his first book, The Kandy-Kolored Tangerine-Flake Streamline Baby, a collection of his writings from the Herald-Tribune, Esquire, and other publications.

This was what Wolfe called New Journalism, in which some journalists and essayists experimented with a variety of literary techniques, mixing them with the traditional ideal of dispassionate, even-handed reporting. Wolfe experimented with four literary devices not normally associated with feature writing: scene-by-scene construction, extensive dialogue, multiple points of view, and detailed description of individuals' status-life symbols (the material choices people make) in writing this stylized form of journalism. He later referred to this style as literary journalism. Of the use of status symbols, Wolfe has said, "I think every living moment of a human being's life, unless the person is starving or in immediate danger of death in some other way, is controlled by a concern for status."

Wolfe also championed what he called "saturation reporting," a reportorial approach in which the journalist "shadows" and observes the subject over an extended period of time. "To pull it off," says Wolfe, "you casually have to stay with the people you are writing about for long stretches ... long enough so that you are actually there when revealing scenes take place in their lives." Saturation reporting differs from "in-depth" and "investigative" reporting, which involve the direct interviewing of numerous sources and/or the extensive analyzing of external documents relating to the story. Saturation reporting, according to communication professor Richard Kallan, "entails a more complex set of relationships wherein the journalist becomes an involved, more fully reactive witness, no longer distanced and detached from the people and events reported."

Wolfe's The Electric Kool-Aid Acid Test is considered a striking example of New Journalism. This account of the Merry Pranksters, a famous sixties counter-culture group, was highly experimental in Wolfe's use of onomatopoeia, free association, and eccentric punctuation—such as multiple exclamation marks and italics—to convey the manic ideas and personalities of Ken Kesey and his followers.

In addition to his own work, Wolfe edited a collection of New Journalism with E. W. Johnson, published in 1973 and titled The New Journalism. This book published pieces by Truman Capote, Hunter S. Thompson, Norman Mailer, Gay Talese, Joan Didion, and several other well-known writers, with the common theme of journalism that incorporated literary techniques and which could be considered literature.

Non-fiction books
In 1965, Wolfe published a collection of his articles in this style, The Kandy-Kolored Tangerine-Flake Streamline Baby, adding to his notability. He published a second collection of articles, The Pump House Gang, in 1968. Wolfe wrote on popular culture, architecture, politics, and other topics that underscored, among other things, how American life in the 1960s had been transformed by post-WWII economic prosperity. His defining work from this era is The Electric Kool-Aid Acid Test (published the same day as The Pump House Gang in 1968), which for many epitomized the 1960s. Although a conservative in many ways (in 2008, he claimed never to have used LSD and to have tried marijuana only once). Wolfe became one of the notable figures of the decade.

In 1970, he published two essays in book form as Radical Chic & Mau-Mauing the Flak Catchers. "Radical Chic" was a biting account of a party given by composer and conductor Leonard Bernstein to raise money for the Black Panther Party. "Mau-Mauing The Flak Catchers" was about the practice by some African Americans of using racial intimidation ("mau-mauing") to extract funds from government welfare bureaucrats ("flak catchers"). Wolfe's phrase, "radical chic", soon became a popular derogatory term for critics to apply to upper-class leftism. His Mauve Gloves & Madmen, Clutter & Vine (1977) included Wolfe's noted essay, The "Me" Decade and the Third Great Awakening.

In 1979, Wolfe published The Right Stuff, an account of the pilots who became America's first astronauts. Following their training and unofficial, even foolhardy, exploits, he likened these heroes to "single combat warriors" of a bygone era, going forth to battle in the Space Race on behalf of their country. In 1983, the book was adapted as a feature film.

In 2016 Wolfe published The Kingdom of Speech, a critique of the work of Charles Darwin and Noam Chomsky. Wolfe synthesized what he construed as the views of Alfred Russel Wallace and Chomsky on the language organ as not being a product of natural selection to suggest that speech is an invention that is responsible for establishing our humanity. Some critics claimed that Wolfe's view on how humans developed speech were not supported by research and were opinionated.

Critiques of art and architecture 
Wolfe also wrote two critiques of and social histories of modern art and modern architecture, The Painted Word and From Bauhaus to Our House, published in 1975 and 1981, respectively. The Painted Word mocked the excessive insularity of the art world and its dependence on what he saw as faddish critical theory. In From Bauhaus to Our House he explored what he said were the negative effects of the Bauhaus style on the evolution of modern architecture.

Made for TV movie 
In 1977, PBS produced Tom Wolfe's Los Angeles, a fictional, satirical TV movie set in Los Angeles. Wolfe appears in the movie as himself.

Novels
Throughout his early career, Wolfe had planned to write a novel to capture the wide reach of American society. Among his models was William Makepeace Thackeray's Vanity Fair, which described the society of 19th-century England. In 1981, he ceased his other work to concentrate on the novel.

Wolfe began researching the novel by observing cases at the Manhattan Criminal Court and shadowing members of the homicide squad in The Bronx. While the research came easily, he encountered difficulty in writing. To overcome his writer's block, Wolfe wrote to Jann Wenner, editor of Rolling Stone, to propose an idea drawn from Charles Dickens and Thackeray: to serialize his novel. Wenner offered Wolfe around $200,000 to serialize his work. The frequent deadline pressure gave him the motivation he had sought, and from July 1984 to August 1985, he published a new installment in each biweekly issue of Rolling Stone.

Later Wolfe was unhappy with his "very public first draft" and thoroughly revised his work, even changing his protagonist, Sherman McCoy. Wolfe had originally made him a writer, but recast him as a bond salesman. Wolfe researched and revised for two years, and his The Bonfire of the Vanities was published in 1987. The book was a commercial and critical success, spending weeks on bestseller lists and earning praise from the very literary establishment on which Wolfe had long heaped scorn.

Because of the success of Wolfe's first novel, there was widespread interest in his second. This novel took him more than 11 years to complete; A Man in Full was published in 1998. The book's reception was not universally favorable, though it received glowing reviews in Time, Newsweek, The Wall Street Journal, and elsewhere. An initial printing of 1.2 million copies was announced and the book stayed at number one on The New York Times bestseller list for ten weeks. Noted author John Updike wrote a critical review for The New Yorker, complaining that the novel "amounts to entertainment, not literature, even literature in a modest aspirant form." His comments sparked an intense war of words in the print and broadcast media among Wolfe and Updike, and authors John Irving and Norman Mailer, who also entered the fray. The novel was selected to be adapted into a television series by Netflix in 2021.

In 2001, Wolfe published an essay referring to these three authors as "My Three Stooges." That year he also published Hooking Up (a collection of short pieces, including the 1997 novella Ambush at Fort Bragg).

He published his third novel, I Am Charlotte Simmons (2004), chronicling the decline of a poor, bright scholarship student from Alleghany County, North Carolina, after attending an elite university. He conveys an institution filled with snobbery, materialism, anti-intellectualism, and sexual promiscuity. The novel met with a mostly tepid response by critics. Many social conservatives praised it in the belief that its portrayal revealed widespread moral decline. The novel won a Bad Sex in Fiction Award from the London-based Literary Review, a prize established "to draw attention to the crude, tasteless, often perfunctory use of redundant passages of sexual description in the modern novel". Wolfe later explained that such sexual references were deliberately clinical.

Wolfe wrote that his goal in writing fiction was to document contemporary society in the tradition of Charles Dickens, Émile Zola, and John Steinbeck.

Wolfe announced in early 2008 that he was leaving his longtime publisher, Farrar, Straus and Giroux. His fourth novel, Back to Blood, was published in October 2012 by Little, Brown and Company. According to The New York Times, Wolfe was paid close to US$7 million for the book. According to the publisher, Back to Blood is about "class, family, wealth, race, crime, sex, corruption and ambition in Miami, the city where America's future has arrived first." The book was released to mixed reviews. Back to Blood was an even bigger commercial failure than I Am Charlotte Simmons.

Critical reception
Kurt Vonnegut said Wolfe is "the most exciting—or, at least, the most jangling—journalist to appear in some time," and "a genius who will do anything to get attention." Paul Fussell called Wolfe a splendid writer and stated "Reading him is exhilarating not because he makes us hopeful of the human future but because he makes us share the enthusiasm with which he perceives the actual." Critic Dwight Garner praised Wolfe as "a brilliantly gifted social observer and satirist" who "made a fetish of close and often comically slashing detail" and was "unafraid of kicking up at the pretensions of the literary establishment." Harold Bloom described Wolfe as "a fierce storyteller, and a vastly adequate social satirist".

Critic James Wood disparaged Wolfe's "big subjects, big people, and yards of flapping exaggeration. No one of average size emerges from his shop; in fact, no real human variety can be found in his fiction, because everyone has the same enormous excitability."

In 2000, Wolfe was criticised by Norman Mailer, John Updike and John Irving, after they were asked if they believed that his books were deserving of their critical acclaim. Mailer compared reading a Wolfe novel to having sex with a 300 lb woman, saying, "Once she gets to the top it's all over. Fall in love or be asphyxiated." Updike was more literary in his reservedness: He claimed that A Man in Full "amounts to entertainment, not literature, even literature in a modest aspirant form." Irving was perhaps the most dismissive, saying "It's like reading a bad newspaper or a bad piece in a magazine... read sentences and watch yourself gag." Wolfe responded, saying, "It's a tantrum. It's a wonderful tantrum. A Man in Full panicked Irving the same way it panicked Updike and Norman. Frightened them. Panicked them." He later called Updike and Mailer "two old piles of bones" and said again that Irving was frightened by the quality of his work. Later that year he published an essay titled My Three Stooges about the critics.

Recurring themes
Wolfe's writing throughout his career showed an interest in social status competition.

Much of Wolfe's later work addresses neuroscience. He notes his fascination in "Sorry, Your Soul Just Died", one of the essays in Hooking Up. This topic is also featured in I Am Charlotte Simmons, as the title character is a student of neuroscience. Wolfe describes the characters' thought and emotional processes, such as fear, humiliation and lust, in the clinical terminology of brain chemistry. Wolfe also frequently gives detailed descriptions of various aspects of his characters' anatomies.

White suit
Wolfe adopted wearing a white suit as a trademark in 1962. He bought his first white suit, planning to wear it in the summer, in the style of Southern gentlemen. He found that the suit he'd bought was too heavy for summer use, so he wore it in winter, which created a sensation. At the time, white suits were supposed to be reserved for summer wear. Wolfe maintained this as a trademark. He sometimes accompanied it with a white tie, white homburg hat, and two-tone spectator shoes. Wolfe said that the outfit disarmed the people he observed, making him, in their eyes, "a man from Mars, the man who didn't know anything and was eager to know."

Views

In 1989, Wolfe wrote an essay for Harper's Magazine, titled "Stalking the Billion-Footed Beast". It criticized modern American novelists for failing to engage fully with their subjects, and suggested that modern literature could be saved by a greater reliance on journalistic technique.

Wolfe supported George W. Bush as a political candidate and said he voted for him for president in 2004 because of what he called Bush's "great decisiveness and willingness to fight". Bush reciprocated the admiration, and is said to have read all of Wolfe's books, according to friends in 2005.

Wolfe's views and choice of subject material, such as mocking left-wing intellectuals in Radical Chic, glorifying astronauts in The Right Stuff, and critiquing Noam Chomsky in The Kingdom of Speech sometimes resulted in his being labeled conservative. Due to his depiction of the Black Panther Party in Radical Chic, a member of the party called him a racist. Wolfe rejected such labels. In a 2004 interview in The Guardian, he said that his "idol" in writing about society and culture is Émile Zola. Wolfe described him as "a man of the left", one who "went out, and found a lot of ambitious, drunk, slothful and mean people out there. Zola simply could not—and was not interested in—telling a lie."

Asked to comment by The Wall Street Journal on blogs in 2007 to mark the tenth anniversary of their advent, Wolfe wrote that "the universe of blogs is a universe of rumors" and that "blogs are an advance guard to the rear." He also took the opportunity to criticize Wikipedia, saying that "only a primitive would believe a word of" it. He noted a story about him in his Wikipedia bio article at the time which he said had never happened.

Wolfe was an atheist but said that "I hate people who go around saying they're atheists". Of his religious upbringing, Wolfe observed that he "was raised as a Presbyterian". Wolfe sometimes referred to himself as a "lapsed Presbyterian."

Personal life
Wolfe lived in New York City with his wife Sheila, who designs covers for Harper's Magazine. They had two children: a daughter, Alexandra; and a son, Thomas Kennerly III.

Death and legacy
Wolfe died from an infection in Manhattan on May 14, 2018, at the age of 88.

The historian Meredith Hindley credits Wolfe with introducing the terms "statusphere", "the right stuff", "radical chic", "the Me Decade" and "good ol' boy" into the English lexicon.

Wolfe was at times incorrectly credited with coining the term "trophy wife". His term for extremely thin women in his novel The Bonfire of the Vanities was "social X-rays".

According to journalism professor Ben Yagoda, Wolfe is also responsible for the use of the present tense in magazine profile pieces; before he began doing so in the early 1960s, profile articles had always been written in the past tense.

List of awards and nominations

Television and film appearances 
Wolfe's legs appeared in John Lennon and Yoko Ono's 1971 film Up Your Legs Forever
 Wolfe was featured as an interview subject in the 1987 PBS documentary series Space Flight.
 In July 1975, Wolfe was interviewed on Firing Line by William F. Buckley Jr., discussing The Painted Word.
 Wolfe was featured on the February 2006 episode "The White Stuff" of Speed Channel's Unique Whips, where his Cadillac's interior was customized to match his trademark white suit.
 Wolfe guest-starred alongside Jonathan Franzen, Gore Vidal and Michael Chabon in The Simpsons episode "Moe'N'a Lisa", which aired November 19, 2006. He was originally slated to be killed by a giant boulder, but that ending was edited out. Wolfe was also used as a sight gag on The Simpsons episode "Insane Clown Poppy", which aired on November 12, 2000. Homer spills chocolate on Wolfe's trademark white suit, and Wolfe rips it off in one swift motion, revealing an identical suit underneath. The episode "Flanders' Ladder" was dedicated to the memory of Wolfe as seen at the end of the episode's credits.

Bibliography

Non-fiction
 The Kandy-Kolored Tangerine-Flake Streamline Baby (1963)
 The Electric Kool-Aid Acid Test (1968)
 The Pump House Gang (1968)
 Radical Chic & Mau-Mauing the Flak Catchers (1970)
 The New Journalism (1973) (Ed. with EW Johnson)
 The Painted Word (1975)
 Mauve Gloves & Madmen, Clutter & Vine (1976)
 The Right Stuff (1979)
 In Our Time (1980)
 a collection of essays and drawings, of the 1970s
 From Bauhaus to Our House (1981)
 The Purple Decades (1982)
 Hooking Up (2000)
 The Kingdom of Speech (2016)

Novels
 The Bonfire of the Vanities (1987)
 Ambush at Fort Bragg (1996/7) Novella
 A Man in Full (1998)
 I Am Charlotte Simmons (2004)
 Back to Blood (2012)

Featured in
 The Sixties, episode 7 (2014)
 Smiling Through the Apocalypse (2013)
 Salinger (2013)
 Felix Dennis: Millionaire Poet (2012)
 Tom Wolfe Gets Back to Blood (2012)
 A Light in the Dark: The Art & Life of Frank Mason (2011)
 Bill Cunningham New York (2010)
 Gonzo: The Life and Work of Dr. Hunter S. Thompson (2008)
 Buy the Ticket, Take the Ride: Hunter S. Thompson on Film (2006)
 Annie Leibovitz: Life Through a Lens (2006)
 Breakfast with Hunter (2003)
 The Last Editor (2002)
 Dick Schaap: Flashing Before my Eyes (2001)
 Where It's At: The Rolling Stone State of the Union (1998)
 Peter York's Eighties: Post (1996)
 Bauhaus in America (1995)
 Manufacturing Consent: Noam Chomsky and the Media (1992)
 Superstar: The Life and Times of Andy Warhol (1990)
 Spaceflight (1985)
 Up Your Legs Forever (1971)

Notable articles
 "The Last American Hero Is Junior Johnson. Yes!" Esquire, March 1965.
 "Tiny Mummies! The True Story of the Ruler of 43rd Street's Land of the Walking Dead!" New York Herald-Tribune supplement (April 11, 1965).
 "Lost in the Whichy Thicket," New York Herald-Tribune supplement (April 18, 1965).
 "The Birth of the New Journalism: Eyewitness Report by Tom Wolfe." New York, February 14, 1972.
 "The New Journalism: A la Recherche des Whichy Thickets." New York, February 21, 1972.
 "Why They Aren't Writing the Great American Novel Anymore." Esquire, December 1972.
 "The Me Decade and the Third Great Awakening" New York, August 23, 1976.
 "Stalking the Billion-Footed Beast", Harper's. November 1989.
 "Sorry, but Your Soul Just Died." Forbes 1996.
 "Pell Mell." The Atlantic Monthly (November 2007).
 "The Rich Have Feelings, Too." Vanity Fair (September 2009).

Writing about Tom Wolfe 
 "How Tom Wolfe became ... Tom Wolfe" by Michael Lewis in Vanity Fair (November 2015).
 Tom Wolfe's America: Heroes, Pranksters, and Fools by Kevin T. McEneaney. Praeger, 2010.

See also 
 Creative nonfiction
 Hysterical realism
 Wolfe's concept of fiction-absolute

Notes

References

External links

 Official website
 Tom Wolfe papers, 1930-2013, held by the Manuscripts and Archives Division, New York Public Library.
 Tom Wolfe Biography and Interview with American Academy of Achievement
 
 Article about Wolfe's recent public appearance at the Chicago Public Library from fNews (a publication of the School of the Art Institute of Chicago)
 "The Word According to Tom Wolfe": Episode 1, Episode 2, Episode 3, Episode 4, and Episode 5 from National Review
 The Future of the American Idea: Pell-Mell in The Atlantic Monthly (November 2007)
 June 2006 interview from frieze
 Tom Wolfe author page by TheGuardian.com
 National Review 100 Best Non Fiction Books 20th century
 Tom Wolfe's 2006 Jefferson Lecture 
 Sorry, but Your Soul Just Died
 
 Tom Wolfe's Steamy Portrait of College Life — an interview about "I Am Charlotte Simmons" in BookPage (December 2004)
 
 In Depth interview with Wolfe, December 5, 2004
 "Should Tom Wolfe Still Hate The New Yorker?"  in Construction Magazine (January 9, 2012).

 
1930 births
2018 deaths
20th-century American novelists
21st-century American essayists
21st-century American novelists
American atheists
American male essayists
American male journalists
American male novelists
American satirical novelists
American satirists
The American Spectator people
Critics of Wikipedia
Harper's Magazine people
Journalists from Virginia
Manhattan Institute for Policy Research
National Book Award winners
National Humanities Medal recipients
New York Herald Tribune people
Novelists from Virginia
Washington and Lee University alumni
Washington and Lee University trustees
Writers from Richmond, Virginia
Writers of American Southern literature
Yale Graduate School of Arts and Sciences alumni
St. Christopher's School (Richmond, Virginia) alumni
20th-century American male writers
21st-century American male writers
Infectious disease deaths in New York (state)